Márton Joób (born 24 June 1982 in Szeged) is a Hungarian sprint canoeist and a politician. He is married to Dóra, and they has 11 children.

Sports career 
As an athlete he has competed since 2003. He won four medals at the ICF Canoe Sprint World Championships with three golds (C-4 200 m: 2007, C-4 500 m: 2007, C-4 1000 m: 2003) and one bronze (C-4 200 m: 2006).

Joób also finished seventh in the C-1 500 m event at the 2004 Summer Olympics in Athens.

Political career 
He is a politician for the Hungarian Socialist Party. He's been a councilman in the local government of Szeged since 2014.

Tax fraud allegations 
Joób has been detained by the National Tax and Customs Office (NAV) on July 28, 2020, on charges of VAT fraud in the range of hundreds of millions of Forints. His house arrest has been ordered on July 30, 2020.

References

External links

1982 births
Canoeists at the 2004 Summer Olympics
Hungarian male canoeists
Living people
Olympic canoeists of Hungary
Sportspeople from Szeged
ICF Canoe Sprint World Championships medalists in Canadian
21st-century Hungarian people